Pierre Dux (21 October 1908 – 1 December 1990) was a French stage director, stage actor, and film actor.  He appeared in 50 films between 1932 and 1990.

Filmography

References

External links

1908 births
1990 deaths
Burials at Montmartre Cemetery
Male actors from Paris
French male film actors
Sociétaires of the Comédie-Française
20th-century French male actors
Administrators of the Comédie-Française
French male stage actors
French National Academy of Dramatic Arts alumni